Jack Spencer Collier (born March 27, 1973) is an American politician who served as a Republican member for the 105th district in the Alabama House of Representatives from 2002 to 2011.  After two terms in the legislature, Collier was appointed as the state's Homeland Security Director by Governor Robert Bentley.  In 2013, the Alabama Legislature passed a bill that consolidated law enforcement and public safety agencies.  On April 5, 2013, after signing the bill into law, Collier was named to the cabinet position as the Secretary of Law Enforcement.  Collier would later be fired and accused of wrongdoing by Governor Bentley for refusing to lie to authorities about an ongoing affair between the then Governor and one of his top political advisors.  Collier was exonerated and won a lawsuit against his accusers for an undisclosed amount.  He would finish out his career as the Police Chief in Selma, Alabama.

References

1973 births
Living people
Republican Party members of the Alabama House of Representatives